Lyncina camelopardalis, common name the camel cowrie, is a species of sea snail, a cowry, a marine gastropod mollusk in the family Cypraeidae, the cowries.

There is one subspecies : Lyncina camelopardalis sharmiensis Heiman & Mienis, 1999

Distribution
This species is distributed in the Red Sea and in the Indian Ocean along Eritrea, Somalia and Madagascar.

References

 MacDonald & Co (1979). The MacDonald Encyclopedia of Shells. MacDonald & Co. London & Sydney

Cypraeidae
Gastropods described in 1811